Stanley Manly (born 1959) is a pseudonym for British author Neil Nixon. His first novel - Raiders of the Low Forehead - was issued in 1999, by Attack! Books a division of Creation Books dedicated to a style characterised as 'avant pulp.' Other authors published by the same imprint included Steven Wells and Tony White. Raiders of the Low Forehead is made of up of 45 chapters, the titles of the chapters rotate - Sex, Food, Violence - allowing every third chapter to include a graphic description of one of the three. In 2008 Manly published a second novel - Workington Dynamo - a coming of age tale set in West Cumbria in the mid 70s.

Bibliography
 Raiders of the Low Forehead 1999 
 Workington Dynamo 2008

References
 3am Essay - 'Judas Pulp' http://www.3ammagazine.com/litarchives/sep2001_judas_pulp.html

External links
 Attack! Books site: http://www.gleeson0.demon.co.uk/attack.htm
 Neil Nixon bibliography: http://www.neilnixon.com/books.htm
 Stanley Manly interview July 2009: http://www.3ammagazine.com/3am/tokyo-bloodbath-stanley-manly-interviewed/
 Review article on Workington Dynamo: http://www.3ammagazine.com/3am/the-peoples-republic-of-workington/
 Stanley Manly author page at Amazon.co.uk: https://www.amazon.co.uk/Stanley-Manly/e/B003OJBU44/ref=ntt_athr_dp_pel_pop_1

1959 births
Living people